The Devil's Chaplain is a 1929 American silent romance film directed by Duke Worne, written by Arthur Hoerl and George Bronson Howard and featuring Boris Karloff. It was produced by Trem Carr and released by Rayart Pictures.

Cast
 Cornelius Keefe as Yorke Norray
 Virginia Brown Faire as Princess Therese
 Josef Swickard as The King
 Boris Karloff as Boris
 Wheeler Oakman as Nicholay
 Leland Carr as Ivan
 George McIntosh as The Prince

See also
 Boris Karloff filmography

References

External links

1929 films
1920s romance films
American silent feature films
American black-and-white films
American romance films
Films directed by Duke Worne
Rayart Pictures films
1920s American films